Elections to Eastleigh Council were held on 1 May 2003.  One third of the council was up for election and the Liberal Democrat party kept overall control of the council.

After the election, the composition of the council was
Liberal Democrat 30
Conservative 10
Labour 4

Election result

Ward results

External links
 BBC report of 2003 Eastleigh election result

2003
2003 English local elections
2000s in Hampshire